Böklund is a municipality in the district of Schleswig-Flensburg, in Schleswig-Holstein, Germany. It is situated approximately 10 km north of Schleswig, and 22 km southeast of Flensburg.

Böklund is the seat of the Amt ("collective municipality") Südangeln.

References

Schleswig-Flensburg